Delphinidin 3',5'-O-glucosyltransferase (UDP-glucose:anthocyanin 3',5'-O-glucosyltransferase, UA3'5'GZ) is an enzyme with systematic name UDP-glucose:delphinidin 3-O-(6-O-malonyl)-beta-D-glucoside 3'-O-glucosyltransferase. This enzyme catalyses the following chemical reaction

 2 UDP-glucose + delphinidin 3-O-(6-O-malonyl)-beta-D-glucoside  2 UDP + delphinidin 3-O-(6-O-malonyl)-beta-D-glucoside-3',5'-di-O-beta-D-glucoside (overall reaction)
(1a) UDP-glucose + delphinidin 3-O-(6-O-malonyl)-beta-D-glucoside  UDP + delphinidin 3-O-(6-O-malonyl)-beta-D-glucoside-3'-O-beta-D-glucoside
(1b) UDP-glucose + delphinidin 3-O-(6-O-malonyl)-beta-D-glucoside-3'-O-beta-D-glucoside  UDP + delphinidin 3-O-(6-O-malonyl)-beta-D-glucoside-3',5'-di-O-beta-D-glucoside

This enzyme catalyses two reactions in the biosynthesis of ternatin C5.

References

External links 
 

EC 2.4.1